"Charge" is a bugle call that signals the command to execute a cavalry or infantry charge. It is especially associated with the United States Cavalry as a result of its frequent use in Western films. A simple unmistakable call, it was even recognizable by experienced horses.

See also
"Charge" (fanfare)

References

Sources
Rabbai, George. Infantry Bugle Calls of the American Civil War. Pacific, MO: Melbay Publications, 1998.

Bugle calls
Military commands